Jonas Malheiro Savimbi (3 August 1934 – 22 February 2002) was an Angolan revolutionary politician and rebel military leader who founded and led the National Union for the Total Independence of Angola (UNITA). UNITA waged a guerrilla war against Portuguese colonial rule from 1966 to 1974, then confronted the People's Movement for the Liberation of Angola (MPLA) during the Angolan Civil War. Savimbi was killed in a clash with government troops in 2002.

Early life

Jonas Malheiro Savimbi was born in Munhango, Bié Province, a small town on the Benguela Railway, and raised in Chilesso, in the same province. Savimbi's father, Lote, was a stationmaster on Angola's Benguela railway line and a preacher of the Protestant Igreja Evangélica Congregacional de Angola (Evangelical Congregational Church of Angola), founded and maintained by American missionaries. Both his parents were members of the Bieno group of the Ovimbundu, the people who later served as Savimbi's major political base.

In his early years, Savimbi was educated mainly in Protestant schools, but also attended Roman Catholic schools. At the age of 24 he received a scholarship to study in Portugal. There he finished his secondary studies, with the exception of the subject "political organization" that was compulsory during the regime established by António de Oliveira Salazar, so that he was unable to start studying medicine as originally intended.

Instead he became associated with students from Angola and other Portuguese colonies who were preparing themselves for anti-colonial resistance and had contacts with the clandestine Portuguese Communist Party. He knew Agostinho Neto, who was at that time studying medicine and who later went on to become president of the MPLA and Angola's first state President. Under increasing pressure from the Portuguese secret police (PIDE), Savimbi left Portugal for Switzerland with the assistance of Portuguese and French communists and other sympathizers, and eventually wound up in Lausanne. There he was able to obtain a new scholarship from American missionaries and studied social sciences. He then went on to the University at Fribourg for further studies.

While there, probably in August 1960, he met Holden Roberto who was already a rising star in émigré circles. Roberto was a founding member of the UPA (União das Populações de Angola) and was already known for his efforts to promote Angolan independence at the United Nations. He tried to recruit Savimbi who seems to have been undecided whether to commit himself to the cause of Angolan independence at this point in his life.

In late September 1960, Savimbi was asked to give a speech in Kampala, Uganda on behalf of the  UDEAN (União Democrática dos Estudantes da Africa Negra), a student organization  affiliated with the MPLA. At this meeting he met Tom Mboya who took him to Kenya to see Jomo Kenyatta. They both urged him to join the UPA. He told French interviewers “J’ai été convaincu par Kenyatta” ('I was convinced by Kenyatta').  He immediately wrote a letter to Roberto putting himself at his service, which was taken in person to New York by Mboya. Upon his return to Switzerland, Roberto telephoned him.  They met in Léopoldville (Kinshasa) in December 1960, and left immediately for America. It was the first of many visits.

There are considerable differences in the source material about the date of Savimbi's official induction into the UPA. Fred Bridgland, who wrote a much-cited biography of Savimbi, says that Savimbi was "inducted into the UPA" on February 1, 1961. Nonetheless, he may not have officially joined the UPA until late 1961.

It certainly seems that Savimbi was not in the inner circle of UPA activists in early 1961. He took no part in planning the uprising of March 1961, nor did he participate in it.

Savimbi stayed in Léopoldville until the end of March 1961, then went to Switzerland to prepare for examinations. He may have failed, for he abandoned medical studies in Fribourg, and in December 1961 enrolled at Lausanne University in Law and International Politics.

By September 1961, Africans from the Portuguese colonies studying abroad formed the UGEAN (União Geral dos Estudantes da Africa Negra Sob Dominacão Colonial Portuguesa) at a meeting in Rabat, Morocco. Again, this organization was affiliated with the MPLA.

Holden Roberto and the UPA wanted a student organization affiliated with their party. In December 1961, Roberto chaired a meeting at Camp Green Lane near Philadelphia, Pennsylvania. Savimbi attended this meeting and became one of a number of organizers who created the UNEA, (União Nacional dos Estudantes Angolanos) in March 1962 at Lucerne Switzerland. Savimbi was elected Secretary-General.

Savimbi participated in UPA activities while continuing to study in Switzerland. He traveled widely on behalf of the organization: to Yugoslavia for the first Non-Aligned Movement Summit in September 1961, with Holden Roberto, and on to New York for the United Nations meeting later that fall.

In a very short time, he was a member of the Executive Committee of the UPA. It was he who encouraged the PDA (Partido Democrático de Angola) to join in a united front with the UPA, creating the FNLA  (Frente Nacional de Libertação de Angola) and when these parties formed the GRAE (Govêrno Revolucionário de Angola no Exílio) on April 3, 1962, Savimbi became Foreign Minister of this organization.

Military career
Savimbi sought a leadership position in the MPLA by joining the MPLA Youth in the early 1960s. He was rebuffed by the MPLA, and joined forces with the National Liberation Front of Angola (FNLA) in 1964. The same year he conceived UNITA with Antonio da Costa Fernandes. Savimbi went to China for help and was promised arms and military training. Upon returning to Angola in 1966 he launched UNITA and began his career as an anti-Portuguese guerrilla fighter. He also fought the FNLA and MPLA, as the three resistance movements tried to position themselves to lead a post-colonial Angola. Portugal later released PIDE (Polícia Internacional e de Defesa do Estado, a Portuguese security agency) archives revealing that Savimbi had signed a collaboration pact with Portuguese colonial authorities to fight the MPLA.

Following Angola's independence in 1975, Savimbi gradually drew the attention of powerful Chinese and, ultimately, American policymakers and intellectuals. Trained in China during the 1960s, Savimbi was a highly successful guerrilla fighter schooled in classic Maoist approaches to warfare, including baiting his enemies with multiple military fronts, some of which attacked and some of which consciously retreated. Like the People's Liberation Army of Mao Zedong, Savimbi mobilized important, although ethnically confined segments of the rural peasantry – overwhelmingly Ovimbundu – as part of his military tactics. From a military strategy standpoint, he can be considered one of the most effective guerrilla leaders of the 20th century.

Civil war
As the MPLA was supported by the Soviet bloc since 1974, and declared itself Marxist-Leninist in 1977, Savimbi renounced his earlier Maoist leanings and contacts with China, presenting himself on the international scene as a protagonist of anti-communism. The war between the MPLA and UNITA, whatever its internal reasons and dynamics, thus became part of the Cold War, with both Moscow and Washington viewing the conflict as important to the global balance of power.

United States support

In 1985, with the backing of the Reagan administration and through the lobbying efforts of Paul Manafort and his firm Black, Manafort, Stone and Kelly which was paid $600,000 each year from Savimbi beginning in 1985, Jack Abramoff and other U.S. conservatives organized the Democratic International in Savimbi's base in Jamba, in Cuando Cubango Province in southeastern Angola. Savimbi was strongly supported by the influential, conservative Heritage Foundation. Heritage foreign policy analyst Michael Johns and other conservatives visited regularly with Savimbi in his clandestine camps in Jamba and provided the rebel leader with ongoing political and military guidance in his war against the Angolan government.

Savimbi's U.S.-based supporters ultimately proved successful in convincing the Central Intelligence Agency to channel covert weapons and recruit guerrillas for Savimbi's war against Angola's Marxist government. During a visit to Washington, D.C. in 1986, Reagan invited Savimbi to meet with him at the White House. Following the meeting, Reagan spoke of UNITA winning "a victory that electrifies the world."

Two years later, with the Angolan Civil War intensifying, Savimbi returned to Washington, where he praised the Heritage Foundation's work on UNITA's behalf.

Military and political efforts

Complementing his military skills, Savimbi also impressed many with his intellectual qualities. He spoke seven languages fluently including Portuguese, French, and English. In visits to foreign diplomats and in speeches before American audiences, he often cited classical Western political and social philosophy, ultimately becoming one of the most vocal anti-communists of the Third World.

Savimbi's biography describes him as "an incredible linguist. He spoke four European languages, including English although he had never lived in an English-speaking country. He was extremely well read. He was an extremely fine conversationalist and a very good listener." Savimbi also accused his political opponents of witchcraft. These contrasting images of Savimbi would play out throughout his life, with his enemies calling him a power-hungry warmonger, and his American and other allies calling him a critical figure in the West's bid to win the Cold War.

As U.S. support began to flow liberally and leading U.S. conservatives championed his cause, Savimbi won major strategic advantages in the late 1980s, and again in the early 1990s, after having taken part unsuccessfully in the general elections of 1992. As a consequence, Moscow and Havana began to reevaluate their engagement in Angola, as Soviet and Cuban fatalities mounted and Savimbi's ground control increased.

By 1989, UNITA held total control of several limited areas, but was able to develop significant guerrilla operations everywhere in Angola, with the exception of the coastal cities and Namibe Province. At the height of his military success, in 1989 and 1990, Savimbi was beginning to launch attacks on government and military targets in and around the country's capital, Luanda. Observers felt that the strategic balance in Angola had shifted and that Savimbi was positioning UNITA for a possible military victory.

Signaling the concern that the Soviet Union was placing on Savimbi's advance in Angola, Soviet leader Mikhail Gorbachev raised the Angolan war with Reagan during numerous U.S.-Soviet summits. In addition to meeting with Reagan, Savimbi also met with Reagan's successor, George H. W. Bush, who promised Savimbi "all appropriate and effective assistance."

1990s
 In January 1990 and again in February 1990, Savimbi was wounded in armed conflict with Angolan government troops. The injuries did not prevent him from again returning to Washington, where he met with his American supporters and President Bush in an effort to further increase US military assistance to UNITA. Savimbi's supporters warned that continued Soviet support for the MPLA was threatening broader global collaboration between Gorbachev and the US.

In February 1992, Antonio da Costa Fernandes and Nzau Puna defected from UNITA, declaring publicly that Savimbi was not interested in a political test, but on preparing another war. Under military pressure from UNITA, the Angolan government negotiated a cease-fire with Savimbi, and Savimbi ran for president in the national elections of 1992.  Foreign monitors claimed the election to be fair. But because neither Savimbi (40%) nor Angolan President José Eduardo dos Santos (49%) obtained the 50 percent necessary to prevail, a run-off election was scheduled.

In late October 1992, Savimbi dispatched UNITA Vice President Jeremias Chitunda and UNITA senior advisor Elias Salupeto Pena to Luanda to negotiate the details of the run-off election. On 2 November 1992 in Luanda, Chitunda and Pena's convoy was attacked by government forces and they were both pulled from their car and shot dead. Their bodies were taken by government authorities and never seen again. The MPLA offensive against UNITA and the FNLA has come to be known as the Halloween Massacre where over 10,000 of their voters were massacred nationwide by MPLA forces. Alleging governmental electoral fraud and questioning the government's commitment to peace, Savimbi withdrew from the run-off election and resumed fighting, mostly with foreign funds. UNITA again quickly advanced militarily, encircling the nation's capital of Luanda.

In 1994, UNITA signed a new peace accord. Savimbi declined the vice-presidency that was offered to him and again renewed fighting in 1998. Savimbi also reportedly purged those within UNITA whom he saw as threats to his leadership or as questioning his strategic course. According to Fred Bridgland, Savimbi's foreign secretary Tito Chingunji and much of his family, possibly numbering more than 60, were murdered in 1991 after Savimbi suspected that Chingunji had been in secret, unapproved negotiations with the Angolan government during Chingunji's various diplomatic assignments in Europe and the United States. Savimbi denied his involvement in the Chingunji killing and blamed it on UNITA dissidents. According to Bridgland in his book The War for Africa: Twelve Months that Transformed a Continent, in an earlier incident termed 'Red September', Savimbi oversaw the torture and killing of dozens of people, including many of his own officers, their wives and children, in a witchcraft ritual. Bridgland also stated that Aurora Katalayo (widow of UNITA leader Mateus Katalaoy, whom Savimbi had allegedly killed a few years earlier) and her four-year old son were burned alive, accused of witchcraft.

Death
After surviving more than six assassination attempts, and having been reported dead at least 17 times, Savimbi was killed on 22 February 2002, in a battle with Angolan government troops along riverbanks in the province of Moxico, his birthplace. In the firefight, Savimbi sustained 15 gunshot wounds to his head, throat, upper body and legs. While Savimbi returned fire, his wounds proved fatal; he died almost instantly.

Savimbi's somewhat mystical reputation for eluding the Angolan military and their Soviet and Cuban military advisors led many Angolans to question the validity of reports of his 2002 death until pictures of his bloodied and bullet-riddled body appeared on Angolan state television, and the United States State Department subsequently confirmed it, did the reports of his death in combat gain credence in the country. He was interred in Luena Main Cemetery in Luena, Moxico Province. On 3 January 2008, his tomb was vandalised and four members of the youth wing of the MPLA were charged and arrested. His body was exhumed and reburied publicly in 2019.

Legacy
Savimbi was succeeded by António Dembo, who assumed UNITA’s leadership on an interim basis in February 2002. But Dembo had sustained wounds in the same attack that killed Savimbi, and he died from them ten days later and was succeeded by Paulo Lukamba. Six weeks after Savimbi's death, a ceasefire between UNITA and the MPLA was signed, but Angola remains deeply divided politically between MPLA and UNITA supporters. A parliamentary election in September 2008 resulted in an overwhelming majority for the MPLA, but its legitimacy was questioned by international observers.

In the years since Savimbi's death, his legacy has been a source of debate. "The mistake that Savimbi made, the historical, big mistake he made, was to reject (the election) and go back to war", Alex Vines, head of the Africa program at London-based Chatham House research institute said in February 2012. Africa expert Paula Roque, of the University of Oxford, says Savimbi was "a very charismatic man, a man who exuded power and leadership. We can't forget that for a large segment of the population, UNITA represented something."

He was survived by "several wives and dozens of children", the latter numbering at least 25.

In popular culture
Savimbi is a minor character in Call of Duty: Black Ops II, a video game that was released in 2012. Savimbi is voiced by Robert Wisdom. Three of Savimbi’s children took issue with Savimbi's representation in the game, claiming that he was portrayed as a "big halfwit who wanted to kill everybody". However, Activision, the publishers of Black Ops II, argued that the game portrayed him as a "political leader and strategist". The lawsuit was rejected by a French court.

See also
Kimberley Process Certification Scheme

Notes and references

References

Bibliography
 
 
 Heywood, Linda M. "Unita and Ethnic Nationalism in Angola." Journal of Modern African Studies 27.1 (1989): 47-66.
 
 
 .
 Neto, Pedro Figueiredo. "The Consolidation of the Angola—Zambia Border: Violence, Forced Displacement, Smugglers and Savimbi." Journal of Borderlands Studies 32.3 (2017): 305-324.
 
 .
 Tvedten, Inge. "US Policy towards Angola since 1975." Journal of Modern African Studies 30.1 (1992): 31-52.
 Windrich, Elaine. Cold War Guerrilla: Jonas Savimbi, the U.S. Media & the Angolan War (1992) 183 pp.

External links

Biographical Entry at BlackPast.org
"White House Statement on the President's Meeting with Jonas Savimbi", 30 June 1988.
"Angola Rebels Demand Death Probe", BBC News, 28 February 2002.

Speeches and essays
"The Coming Winds of Democracy in Angola", Jonas Savimbi speech to The Heritage Foundation, 5 October 1989
Policy Review vol. 35, contains Savimbi's 1986 essay "The War Against Soviet Colonialism".

Video

French interview of Jonas Savimbi, 1978.
.

Angolan politicians
Angolan revolutionaries
Angolan warlords
1934 births
2002 deaths
20th century in Angola
Angolan anti-communists
Angolan Protestants
Angolan rebels
Assassinated Angolan politicians
Blood diamonds
Deaths by firearm in Angola
Guerrilla warfare theorists
Guerrillas killed in action
Members of UNITA
People from Bié Province
UNITA politicians
University of Lausanne alumni
20th-century Angolan people
21st-century Angolan people
Candidates for President of Angola
Angolan independence activists
Former Marxists